Arthur Huang (born 1978) is a Taiwanese structural engineer and architect. In 2005, he established Miniwiz, an internationally operating company based in Taiwan, Singapore, Beijing and Milan, and dedicated to upcycling and consumer trash and industrial waste.

Early life and education 
Arthur Huang was born in Taiwan in 1978 and moved to the United States at age 11. Educated as an architect from Cornell University, armed with structural engineering knowledge. In Cornell University, Arthur was awarded the Charles Goodwin Sands Memorial Medal and academic leadership award for his work in design and technical performance.

Continuing his search for multi-disciplinary professional training, he graduated from Harvard University with a Master of Architecture degree in 2004 with special interest invested in green business development. At the age of 26, Huang taught as a full-time at Tunghai University Architecture Program in Taiwan for two years, and he subsequently continues his teaching as part-time assistant professor at National Chiao Tung University in Taiwan, lecturing in MBA, material engineering, and architecture design courses.

Career at Miniwiz 
During his teaching life, he was aware that there were many who spoke of environmental issues, but few who had developed appealing products. Hence, he established Miniwiz in March 2005, which was registered and located in Taipei, Taiwan. Miniwiz deals with post consumer recycling technology, built infrastructure and architectural solutions. Miniwiz has been challenging the existing linear supply chain by using post-consumer recycled materials for high performance applications, retail store interiors, factory campuses or consumer goods.

Notable works 
 2013 Area 13 – Taipei, Taiwan
 2013 Nike X158 Hyper Nature – Shanghai, China
 2012 Nike the Feather Pavilion – Beijing, China
 2011 EcoArk - Taipei, Taiwan

Awards and honors 
 2016 - Emerging Explorer, National Geographic
 2015 - Technology Pioneer, World Economic Forum
 2013 - IDEA GOLD Award, Chicago, USA
 2012 - Mayor Bloomberg's New York Venture Fellowship, New York, USA 
 2011 - Wall Street Journal Innovation Award, Hong Kong
 2011 - 40 under 40 Design Talent Award, Perspective, Asia

References

1978 births
Cornell University College of Architecture, Art, and Planning alumni
Harvard Graduate School of Design alumni
Living people
Taiwanese architects
Taiwanese chief executives
People from Taipei
Taiwanese expatriates in the United States